The following is an episode list for the Disney Channel sitcom Phil of the Future. The series premiered on June 18, 2004 and ended on August 19, 2006 with 43 episodes spanning two seasons.

Series overview

Episodes

Season 1 (2004–05)

Season 2 (2005–06)

References

External links
 List of Phil of the Future episodes at TV Guide.com

Lists of American sitcom episodes
Lists of American children's television series episodes
Lists of Disney Channel television series episodes
Television episodes about time travel